Carrickmacross Emmets is a Gaelic football club from Carrickmacross in County Monaghan in Ireland. The club was founded in 1887. The club participates in Monaghan competitions. The club has won the Monaghan Senior Football Championship eight times and have come runner-up seven times. The Club colours are Green and Yellow. The first club grounds played on were Athletic Grounds, then the Gaelic Grounds. In 1938 the club moved to its present grounds at Emmet Park, which was developed into one of the best venues in the county. It was officially opened in 1953 when Monaghan played Meath. In recent years the club secured property on the Donaghmoyne Road and have developed a full size playing pitch and a training area along with modern changing facilities that can cater for four teams. At present the site is chiefly used for training purposes for adult and juvenile teams as well as ladies and hurling teams but games can be played there when necessary.

The Early Years 

Carrickmacross Emmets have been in existence since the 1880s and are reckoned to be the oldest club in County Monaghan. In 1884 a great revival in Gaelic games was underway with clubs springing up all over the county but they had no real organisation or supervision and the many tournaments that were being run ended in disorder and chaos! By 1887 all counties were instructed by the GAA to affiliate to the governing body under the rules of the Association. The first ever GAA meeting in Monaghan was held in O’Neills Hotel in Carrickmacross on 27 December to elect a County Committee, it was attended by the Carrickmacross Sextons and the Carrickmacross O’Briens; both remnants of the original Emmets team; this split arose out of a complete disunion within the GAA which had taken place in November 1887. The first official meeting of the new County Board was also held in O’Neills Hotel in February 1888; when the following officers were elected; (President) Rev William McKenna CC (Vice President) Rev J McCarney, who was later Monaghan's first delegate to Central Council; (Secretary) Owen Cahill, Carrickmacross; (Treasurer) Patrick Lee, Carrickmacross.

It was decided to hold a Football Championship at Capragh on 27 May 1887. The Carrickmacross Sextons reached the final of the competition but were well beaten by the Inniskeen Grattans who went on to represent Monaghan in the All-Ireland championship. Later that year the Carrickmacross Emmets made their reappearance as a team; with a challenge match against the Baileborough Raparees which was played at Shercock on 29 July with the return game being staged in a field close to Carrickmacross town on 5 August; both games proved to be a great success for both the players and supporters. The following year the Sextons and the O’Briens and a team called the Farney Wanderers represented the town in the County Football Championship; however with the GAA in disarray in Monaghan; the competition was never concluded.

Next mention of the Emmets came to notice in April 1896 when they played the Aghalile Grattan’s in a challenge match and again in August when they played Virginia Sarsfields in the Killanny Tournament. In October of the same year the Emmets ran a fine football tournament in close proximity to the town and the vast crowd of spectators were thoroughly satisfied with the day’s proceedings. In the subsequent years games were practically non-existent in relation to Gaelic activity and it was 1901 before we read about a football game near Carrickmacross "The pitch wasn’t properly marked and so ended the tournament under the auspices of the Carrickmacross Gaelic club whose existence is a myth"

Official Founding and early 1900s 

On September 26, 1903, a meeting of those interested in Gaelic games was held in the Foresters Hall, Carrickmacross to elect officers and to establish the club to the County Board. By coincidence it was also the Centenary of the death of Robert Emmet; the identity formerly associated with the original Carrickmacross team; it was unanimously agreed to again adopt the name of the young Irish patriot! The following officers were elected at that meeting; (Captain) Owen Sherry (Vice Captain) J Jones; (Treasurer) Joseph Connolly; (Secretary) Thomas Markey. 
The following month the new Emmets travelled to Kingscourt to play the local Sinn Féin team in a challenge match. By January 1904, the Emmets were in full swing when they played Inniskeen to a draw match; they also participated in tournaments at Killanny, Killark and Magheracloone as well as running their own tournament competition. Also in 1904 the first inter-county match to be played in many years was organised by the Cavan Foresters; it was played at the Cavan Agricultural grounds between Cavan and Monaghan; with the Emmets representing Monaghan and the Slashers representing Cavan!  On 12 May a meeting of the established clubs met in the Foresters Hall to put in place foundations for a new and vibrant Association in Monaghan in which the Carrickmacross Emmets would ultimately play a huge part as one of the foremost teams in Gaelic football at both underage and adult levels!

In 1908 the club won its first senior championship against Inniskeen at Athletic Grounds Carrickmacross. Man of the match was Jemmy Downey. There were great celebrations in Carrickmacross that night as the club captured their first County Championship the match was widely reported for the high standard of play from both teams.      Carrickmacross; James Costello, James Downey, John Slevin, John Gartland Jess Connolly, Ignatius McCaffery, Jemmy Duffy, James Devine, P Finnegan, Pat McKeown, Mick Keelan, J Flood, Willie Flood, A Murray, T McCaffery, J Finnegan and William O’Brien. The final score in this match was Carrickmacross 1.03 0.01 Inniskeen.

Having represented Monaghan in the 1908 Ulster senior championship it looked as if Carrickmacross Emmets might not take part in the County Championship series in 1909 as they had incurred a suspension but on appeal the penalty was rescinded. The final of the County Championship between Currin and Carrickmacross Emmets was played at Foy’s Green, Cootehill on Sunday 11 April 1909.  A large crowd witnessed the final. The final outcome of this one-sided final was Carrickmacross 2.12 Currin 1.01. Carrickmacross panel James Costello, James Downey, John Slevin, John Gartland Jess Connolly, Ignatius McCaffery, James Duffy, James Devine, P Finnegan, Pat McKeown, Mick Keelan, J Flood, Willie Flood, A Murray, Tom McCaffery, J Finnegan, Willie O’Brien, N Murray, Jim Farrelly, Owen Sherry, T Finnegan, Jim O’Brien, Larry Jones.

1910s 

Carrick won the championship for the third year in a row on Sunday 9 October 1910 at Derrygooney, Bawn. Carrickmacross Emmets and Monaghan Harps met in the final of the football championship of the county! Both teams were at full strength and Monaghan Harps fielded the strongest team that has represented the North for some time; to try conclusions with the County Champions of 1908 and 1909 the game itself was a fairly good one but hardly up to the standard of a county final. 
The final score was Carrickmacross Emmets 0.03 Monaghan Harps 0.00
Carrickmacross: P Dornan, James Costello, O’Connell, James Downey, Nig McCaffrey, Jess Connolly, John Slevin, T Finnegan, T McKeown, Mick Keelan, Jim O’Brien, James Devine, Jemmy Duffy, J McCabe.

For the next three years the club failed to win the championship Ture Davits beat Roslea in the final of the North Monaghan League (April 1914) and with a couple of exceptions they played a splendid match and it was said; that if they kept in trim; it was expected that they would come out county champions; meanwhile Carrickmacross won the South Monaghan championship! The county final was fixed for Creeve on Sunday 7 June 1914. Subsequently, at meeting of Monaghan County Board in Ballybay on Saturday 6 June the day before the fixture was to take place; Carrickmacross Emmets were declared the Senior County Champions! The runner-up Ture having dissolved or amalgamated with other clubs!

1914 was a strange year in Monaghan football. The eagerly awaited finals of County Monaghan football and hurling championships were played at Ballybay on Sunday 15 November. In hurling Carrickmacross beat Clones/Monaghan 3.02 to 0.00.  The unpleasant atmospheric conditions militated against the success of the fixture; but the afternoon turned out satisfactory and there was nothing to complain about in the attendance. 
No time was lost in starting the football match and at 3.40 pm the teams lined out. The half time score was Carrickmacross 2.00 Magherarney 0.00. On resuming the North men having the advantage played with determination and secured a well-scored goal. The Young Irelands still attacked but were stubbornly opposed by the Emmets; some of the latter having to be severely reprimanded by the referee. The shades of night had fallen when the final whistle sounded. The final score was Carrickmacross 2.00 Magherarney 1.01. 
After the match was over the County Secretary got the referee’s decision which was as follows: The Emmets have won on the score of 2.00 to 1.01 but since a player of the former stoutly refused to obey my ruling, I have no alternative but to award the match to Magherarney. The referee's report was adopted and Magherarney declared champions. Carrickmacross: Clifford, John Slevin, James Downey, Kelly, McConnon, Jess Connolly, Kiely, Clinton, James Devine, Nig McCaffrey, Jemmy Duffy, T Finnegan, Mick Keelan, John Gartlan, Nugent.

Doohamlet was the venue on Sunday (1 October 1915) for three matches; one being the Senior Football final of 1915 between Carrickmacross and Killeevan. There was a very large attendance and the weather was beautiful. Proceedings opened with a hurling match between North and South (Carrickmacross) which the South won! The big event then took place with the Emmets being represented by Downey, Cooney, Connolly, M’Califf, Gartlan, Kelly, McCaffrey, Farrell, Hand, Keelan, Farrell, Marron, Kelly. On turning over Carrickmacross assumed the upper hand and ran out winners by 1.05 to 0.02. The losers put up a great fight but on the whole they missed many scores.

Application had been made for a new team in Carrickmacross in 1918. The Chairman said he thought the same could not be granted till Annual Convention. Mr Devine said he understood some of the officers of the Emmets were in the new club, although the Emmets had made no change. The Chairman advocated unity and said a town like Carrickmacross could be scarcely afford two clubs. No matter how they might differ politically, they should all join hands in the GAA. It was eventually decided that representatives from both clubs meet in the Catholic Hall to discuss the question of amalgamation for league purposes this season. The reorganised amalgamation went on to win the Senior Football Championship!

The 1919 Monaghan County Final was played at Ballybay on Sunday 26 October. Favoured with a fine day it is estimated that over two-thousand people attended from Armagh, Louth, Fermanagh, Cavan and Monaghan. 
It was 4.30pm when Rev W P O’Brien CC Ballybay threw in the ball! Carrickmacross at once broke away and the Clontibret O'Neills backs were tested. Clinton cleared and play was dull for fifteen minutes. There were slight fouls and the uneven surface left the ball out of play time and again! When J Marron shot a point for Carrickmacross the game became exciting and the Farney men showed their superiority by scoring two-points before half-time. During half-time the Carrickmacross Band played a victory march. On resuming Clontibret were mainly on the defensive and their team was badly placed, the forwards going back to help the defence! The Emmets scored a goal per Carragher and two points were registered by them towards the close. The shades of the night were falling when the final whistle sounded the score Carrickmacross 1.05  Clontibret 0.00 
Carrickmacross: Mick Farmer, J Marron, James Downey, Keenan, McBride, Carragher, Donoghue, Murphy, Malone, McHugh, Ward, Phil Marron, Jerry Cumiskey, Jack Cumiskey, John Slevin.

Notable players
James Downey captained the Emmets to senior championships and Monaghan to Ulster titles early in the 1900s. Paddy Kilroy captained Monaghan to their only appearance in a Senior All Ireland final in 1930. Sean O'Carroll was also on that team and got a serious injury in the final. Stephen Gollogly is a member of the Monaghan team 2005/2018 winning two Ulster Senior Championships and an NFL Division two title as well as several club titles.

Main Honours 
 Monaghan Senior Football Championships 
 (7) 1908, 1909, 1910, 1913, 1915, 1918, 1919:	
 Runner-up: Eight times 1888, 1906, 1928, 1934, 1949, 1989, 2008:	
 Monaghan Senior Football League (1)
 2008                                                                                                                   
 Monaghan Intermediate Football Championship: (5)
 1971, 1976, 2006, 2011, 2017                                                                            
 Monaghan Intermediate Football League (5)
 1993, 2002, 2006, 2001, 2017: 
 Monaghan Junior Football Championship (2)
 1964, 1992
 Underage Competitions; Numerous titles at all ages including three under fourteen county titles in a row 1961, 1962 and 1963 never equalled since!

References

External links
Official Carrickmacross Emmets GAA Club website

Carrickmacross
Gaelic football clubs in County Monaghan
Gaelic games clubs in County Monaghan
Hurling clubs in County Monaghan